Phil Trow (born 9 September 1966, in Manchester) is a broadcaster at BBC Radio Manchester and has worked in radio for over 30 years.

Life
Trow began broadcasting on a Hospital radio station at Park Hospital in Davyhulme, Manchester.

He started his professional career at Signal Radio in Stoke at the age of nineteen before joining the BBC Radio Manchester in 1990.

Whilst at Signal Radio, had a Number One record (in Staffordshire) with the 'Telethon Rap' with Lee Finan. Robbie Williams worked for Phil and Trow was the first radio presenter to play a Take That record (Do what you like).

He worked for BBC GMR for 15 years before moving to BBC Radio Lancashire in 2003. Whilst with BBC GMR he was part of the team that won a Sony award for coverage of the Manchester bomb. In 2006, he began presenting the BBC Radio Lancashire Sunday morning programme with Sally Bankes.

Trow became the BBC Radio Derby Breakfast Show presenter in April 2010, although he had worked as a freelance for the station for six months.

In March 2013 he left the Breakfast Show on BBC Radio Derby after 3 years and returned to present the Drive Time show on  BBC Radio Manchester.

Trow has been a 'warm up' man for CBBC working on programmes like Get Your Own Back. He is a regular presenter for the BBC Exhibitions working on Gardeners World Live and the Good Homes Show and is a voice over artist in the North West.

On television, he has worked on Men and Motors and presented Children in Need and is a presenter of Channel M Breakfast on Channel M.

A Blackpool FC fan he is also the Matchday Compere at the club.

References

Living people
English radio personalities
1966 births